Ruthless Records Tenth Anniversary: Decade of Game is a compilation album released by Ruthless Records. The album featured some of the label's greatest hits from the previous ten years. It peaked at 119 on the Billboard 200 and 44 on the Top R&B/Hip-Hop Albums.

Track listing

Disc 1
"Intro" – :40  
"24 Hours to Live" – 4:42 (Eazy-E) 
"Dopeman" – 5:37 (N.W.A) 
"Untouchable" – 3:39 (Above the Law) 
"Same Ol' Shit" – 4:05 (MC Ren)  
"Great Tazte-Less Fillaz" – 4:32 (H.W.A.) 
"It's Funky Enough" – 4:28 (The D.O.C.)  
"Alwayz into Somethin'" – 4:29 (N.W.A) 
"Fuck What Ya Heard" – 4:08 (MC Ren)  
"I Ain't No Lady" – 3:35 (H.W.A.) 
"Murder Rap" – 4:55 (Above the Law)  
"Real Muthaphuckkin G's" – 5:24 (Eazy-E)

Disc 2
"Black Nigga Killa" – 4:47 (Eazy-E) 
"8 Ball" – 4:48 (N.W.A)  
"Final Frontier" – 4:11 (MC Ren) 
"The Formula" – 4:10 (The D.O.C.)  
"Black Superman" – 4:26 (Above the Law)
"Supersonic" – 3:55 (J.J. Fad)
"Boyz-n-the-Hood (Remix)" – 6:40 (Eazy-E) 
"Something in My Heart" – 5:48 (Michel'le) 
"Nicety" – 3:23 (Michel'le) 
"The Grand Finale" – 4:38 (The D.O.C & N.W.A) 
"Outro" – 1:16

Chart history

References

External links

1998 compilation albums
Ruthless Records compilation albums
Hip hop compilation albums
Gangsta rap compilation albums
Albums produced by Dr. Dre
Albums produced by DJ Yella
Albums produced by Cold 187um
Albums produced by Laylaw
Albums produced by L.T. Hutton
Albums produced by Rhythum D